The LG Optimus LTE is one of the first released 4G LTE smartphones running under the Android operating system that is manufactured by LG. It was first released on October 10, 2011 in South Korea.

Variants

LG Nitro HD
The LG Nitro HD (LG P930) is U.S. variant of the LG Optimus LTE for AT&T. It was released on December 4, 2011. At the time of release, it was the only 4G phone on AT&T to feature a true HD, 1280×720 AH-IPS display. An OS update to Android 4.0, Ice Cream Sandwich, was released on July 31, 2012.

LG Spectrum
The LG Spectrum (LG VS920) is U.S. variant of the LG Optimus LTE for Verizon Wireless. It was released on January 19, 2012.  An OS update to Android 4.0, Ice Cream Sandwich, was released on November, 2012.

Optimus LTE L-01D
The Optimus LTE L-01D is Japanese variant of the LG Optimus LTE for NTT docomo. It was released on December 15, 2011. This variant includes several additional features such as 1seg terrestrial television and FeliCa (Wallet Mobile).

LG Optimus True HD LTE

The LG Optimus True HD LTE(LG-P936) is among other countries in Europe and Asia the name of the German edition of the LG Optimus LTE for Vodafone. In Germany it was presented to the public for the first time at the end of April 2012 in Düsseldorf. In Sweden, Portugal, Singapore and Hong Kong the Optimus True HD LTE was also sold from the end of April.

See also
LG Optimus

References

Android (operating system) devices
LG Electronics smartphones
Mobile phones introduced in 2011
Discontinued smartphones